Manitoba is a province of Canada.

Manitoba may also refer to:
Manitoba (computer chip), a computer chip made by Intel in 2006
Manitoba (horse), a British-Australian Thoroughbred racehorse
Lake Manitoba, a lake in Manitoba, Canada
Manitoba Junction, Minnesota, an unincorporated community in the United States

Music 
Manitoba (American band), punk rock band formed in New York City
Richard Manitoba (born 1954), American musician and satellite radio DJ
Manitoba (Canadian band), electronic band led by Dan Snaith

Transportation 
 , operated by the Hudson's Bay Company from 1880–1884, see Hudson's Bay Company vessels
 , the first steel-hulled ship to be built in Canada (see Polson Iron Works)
 , a lake freighter operated by Lower Lakes Towing
 45558 Manitoba, a British LMS Jubilee Class locomotive

See also 
 Manitoba Colony (disambiguation)
 Republic of Manitobah